Walter Dayrell (17 February 1610 – 29 March 1684) was the a Canon and Archdeacon of Winchester from 1666 to 1684.

Education
He was educated at John Roysse's Free School in Abingdon, (now Abingdon School).  He later studied at Jesus College, Oxford and Christ Church, Oxford and gained a Doctor of Divinity.

Career
He is listed as being a lawyer and an important citizen in Abingdon during the early seventeenth century and resided at Lacies Court (now in the grounds of Abingdon School).

He succeeded Thomas Gorges as Archdeacon of Winchester in 1666, a post he held until his death in 1684. He was the first regularly appointed Recorder of the Abingdon Borough and has his arms engraved at St Nicolas Church, Abingdon because he was a benefactor.

See also
 List of Old Abingdonians

References

1610 births
1684 deaths
People educated at Abingdon School
Alumni of Jesus College, Oxford
Alumni of Christ Church, Oxford
Archdeacons of Winchester (ancient)